The Krahô are an indigenous Timbira Gê people of northeastern Brazil. The Krahô historically inhabited a portion of modern Maranhão along the Balsas River, but were pushed west by pioneer settlement and cattle farmers. Currently, the Krahô live on the Terra Indígena Kraolândia reservation in Tocantins.

The Krahô have historically been seminomadic, practicing hunting and gathering and shifting cultivation.

Terra Indígena Kraolândia 
Modern Krahô live on the Terra Indígena Kraolândia, an Indigenous territory in the Goiatins and Itacajá, Tocantins near the Maranhão-Tocantins border.

References 

Indigenous peoples in Brazil